Cyphosperma is a genus of flowering plants in the family Arecaceae, native to various islands of the Pacific. It contains the following species:

 Cyphosperma balansae (Brongn.) H.Wendl. ex Salomon - New Caledonia
 Cyphosperma naboutinense Hodel & Marcus - Fiji
 Cyphosperma tanga (H.E.Moore) H.E.Moore - Fiji
 Cyphosperma trichospadix  (Burret) H.E.Moore - Fiji
 Cyphosperma voutmelensis Dowe  - Vanuatu

References

 
Arecaceae genera
Taxonomy articles created by Polbot
Taxa named by Joseph Dalton Hooker